Ecology Law Quarterly is an environmental law review published quarterly by students at the UC Berkeley School of Law. The journal also produces Ecology Law Currents, an "online companion journal designed to publish pieces on a more frequent basis than the print journal."

Recognition 
Ecology Law Quarterly received the United Nations Environment Programme's "Global 500 Roll of Honour" Award in 1990, in recognition of its environmental achievements.

In a 1998 survey of experts, Ecology Law Quarterly was ranked as the most influential environmental law review in the United States.

In Washington & Lee School of Law's 2020 combined score rankings of Environmental and Land Use Law journals, Ecology Law Quarterly ranked 3rd overall. 

Ecology Law Quarterly articles have been cited by various courts, including the U.S. Supreme Court,  U.S. Courts of Appeal,  and U.S. District Courts.  Ecology Law Quarterly received the highest number of case citations of any environmental law journal in 2015, 2016, and 2017.

See also 
 List of environmental law journals

References

External links 
  (for both Ecology Law Quarterly and Ecology Law Currents)

Environmental law journals
University of California, Berkeley
Quarterly journals
Publications established in 1971
English-language journals
Law in the San Francisco Bay Area
Law journals edited by students